Ultra is the debut studio album by English pop band Ultra, released on 25 January 1999 by East West Records (Warner Music Group).

The album debuted and peaked at number 37 on the UK Albums Chart and spawned several hit singles in the UK and Europe. It was mainly performed and co-written by James Hearn; vocals and piano, Michael Harwood; vocals and guitar, Nick Keynes; bass, and Jon O'Mahony; drums and percussion. It was produced by ex Tears for Fears member, Ian Stanley.

Track listing

Personnel
 Art direction – Paul West & Paula Benson at FORM
 Artwork design – John Siddle at FORM®
 Bass – Nick Keynes
 Co-production – Steve Robson (tracks 1, 2, 4, 5, 9)
 Drums, percussion – Jon O'Mahony
 Guitar – Michael Harwood
 Mixing – Bob Kraushaar (tracks 1, 3 to 10), Andy Bradfield, Steve Robson (track 2)
 Sound Production – Nick Paul
 Photography – Julian Barton  
 Production – Ian Stanley (tracks 1 to 5, 7, 9), Steve Robson (tracks 3, 6–8, 10)
 Vocals, piano – James Hearn
 Additional keyboards – Neil Cowley (tracks 1, 3, 4)
 Backing vocals – Keri Schmidt (tracks 1, 2, 5, 8) and Viveen Wray (tracks 6, 7)
 Engineering – Steve Robson (track 1)
 Remixing, additional production – Steelworks (track 3)

Charts

References

External links
Ultra debut album at Discogs
Ultra debut album at allmusic

1999 debut albums
Albums produced by Ian Stanley
East West Records albums
Ultra (British band) albums